Frode Rasmussen Kirkebjerg (10 May 1888 – 12 January 1975) was a Danish horse rider who competed in the 1912 Summer Olympics and in the 1924 Summer Olympics.

In 1912 he did not finish the Individual eventing (Military) competition, also the Danish team did not finish the team event. Twelve years later he won the silver medal in the individual three-day event (Military) event.

Family 
Frode had three children:  Lars Eivind Bluun Kirkebjerg, Dorrit Kirkebjerg Dawes, and Lisbet Kirkebjerg Abrams.

References

1888 births
1975 deaths
Danish male equestrians
Equestrians at the 1912 Summer Olympics
Equestrians at the 1924 Summer Olympics
Olympic equestrians of Denmark
Olympic silver medalists for Denmark
Event riders
Olympic medalists in equestrian
Medalists at the 1924 Summer Olympics